Spiegelbild ("Reflection") is the fourth studio album by German recording artist Cassandra Steen. It was released by Polydor and Island Records on 3 October 2014 in German-speaking Europe. Songwriting and co-production on the album was overseen by singer Tim Bendzko with whom Steen had previously collaborated on their 2013 single "Unter die Haut", while music production on most tracks was helmed by Christian "Crada" Kalla.

Track listing

Charts

Weekly charts

Release history

References

External links
 CassandraSteen.de — official website

2014 albums
German-language albums
Cassandra Steen albums